Od railway station is a railway station on the Western Railway network in the state of Gujarat, India.

References

See also
 Anand district

Railway stations in Anand district
Vadodara railway division